Kyle Platzer (born March 4, 1995) is a Canadian professional ice hockey Forward currently playing with Tappara in the Finnish Liiga. He was drafted by the Edmonton Oilers in the fourth-round, 96th overall, of the 2013 NHL Entry Draft.

Playing career
Platzer played major junior hockey with the London Knights and the Owen Sound Attack in the Ontario Hockey League (OHL) and was selected by the Oilers in the 2013 NHL Entry Draft, 96th overall. He was later signed to a three-year, entry-level contract with the Oilers on April 5, 2015.

Platzer made his professional debut in the American Hockey League (AHL), appearing with the Oilers affiliates, the Oklahoma City Barons and the Bakersfield Condors. 

A free agent following his entry-level contract with the Oilers, Platzer left North America after four seasons in the minor leagues, and signed a contract with top tier Finnish outfit, KooKoo of the Liiga on July 10, 2019. Establishing himself with KooKoo, Platzer enjoyed two productive seasons in the Liiga, collecting 70 points in 108 games.

On May 19, 2021, Platzer as a free agent joined fellow Finnish club, Tappara, on a one-year deal for the 2021–22 season.

Career statistics

References

External links

1995 births
Living people
Bakersfield Condors players
Canadian ice hockey players
Edmonton Oilers draft picks
Florida Everblades players
KooKoo players
London Knights players
Owen Sound Attack players
Oklahoma City Barons players
Tappara players
Wichita Thunder players